Peter MacDonald (born 20 June 1939) is an English film director, cinematographer, and producer from London, England. A prolific second unit director, MacDonald has worked on various Hollywood blockbusters including Guardians of the Galaxy, The Bourne Ultimatum, Harry Potter and the Prisoner of Azkaban, and The Empire Strikes Back.

Career
Starting his career in the camera department, MacDonald subsequently spent 10 years as camera operator for renowned cinematographer Geoffrey Unsworth, working on films including Superman, The Return of the Pink Panther, Murder on the Orient Express and Cabaret.  After Unsworth's death in 1978, MacDonald increasingly worked as a second unit director, and as a cinematographer himself.

MacDonald's debut as director, Rambo III, came about at extremely short notice.  "I started it without any preparation," he explained in an interview, "because Russell Mulcahy [Rambo III'''s original director] left after two weeks, so I came into it totally ill-prepared - I was directing the second unit on the film. Literally the day before I left America to start Rambo III I'd finished photographing a film, Shag, in America;  came to Israel, thinking I was going to do a second unit which I could slowly get into, and within a week or two I was directing one of the most expensive films ever made."  MacDonald has since directed other productions including The NeverEnding Story III, and the television mini-series The Monkey King (also known as The Lost Empire). In 2016, MacDonald was hired to direct reshoots during post-production on Rogue One: A Star Wars Story.

MacDonald currently works most frequently as a second unit director. He has said about this role, "The most important thing about any second unit is that you can't tell the difference between the second unit and the first unit.  It must have the stamp of the first unit, both in photography and the style of direction. That's why, when I do second unit, I always photograph and direct, so you try and copy what the first unit does as much as possible.  You mustn't be on an ego trip and try and do your own style, because your material has to cut into theirs and it mustn't jar, it must fit in exactly so no-one can tell the difference."  MacDonald has directed second unit on such films as X-Men Origins: Wolverine, The Bourne Ultimatum, Harry Potter and the Goblet of Fire, Batman (1989), and Cry Freedom.

Selected filmography

As directorRambo III (1988)Mo' Money (1992)The Young Indiana Jones Chronicles (1993 episode "The Phantom Train of Doom")The NeverEnding Story III: Return to Fantasia (1994)Tales from the Crypt (1996 episode "Escape")Legionnaire (1998) (director and producer)The Extreme Adventures of Super Dave (2000)The Lost Empire (2001)

As producerGraffiti Bridge (1990) (executive producer)

As camera operatorCabaret (1972)Murder on the Orient Express (1974)Zardoz (1974)The Return of the Pink Panther (1975)Superman: The Movie (1978)Superman II (1980)Yentl (1983)Legend (1985)

As cinematographerSolarbabies (1986)Hamburger Hill (1987)Shag (1989)

As second unit directorZulu Dawn (1979)The Empire Strikes Back (1980) (location second unit director)Dragonslayer (1981)Excalibur (1981) (second unit director/photographer)Rambo: First Blood Part II (1985) (helicopter unit director/photographer)Batman (second unit director/photographer)Tango & Cash (1989) (executive producer and second unit director)The Quest (1996) (executive producer and second unit director)Harry Potter and the Chamber of Secrets (2002)Harry Potter and the Prisoner of Azkaban (2004)Harry Potter and the Goblet of Fire (2005) (co-producer and second unit director)Eragon (2006)The Golden Compass (2007)X-Men Origins: Wolverine'' (2009)

References

External links
 

1939 births
Living people
British cinematographers
Film directors from London
Action film directors